The 2011 The All-Japan Rugby Football Championship (日本ラグビーフットボール選手権大会 Nihon Ragubi- Futtobo-ru Senshuken Taikai) starts on Feb 6th and finishes with the final on Feb 27th.

Qualifying

Top League
The top four teams (Toshiba Brave Lupus, Sanyo Wild Knights, Toyota Verblitz, Suntory Sungoliath) in the Top League automatically qualifying for the competition competed in the playoffs for the Top League playoff title and a place in the semi-finals of the Championship.

Sanyo Wild Knights and Suntory Sungoliath eventually competed in the final, with Sanyo Wild Knights winning 28-23. As finalists this gained them automatic entry to the Championship Semi-finals.

The Top League Wildcard Tournament was contested by the fifth to tenth teams in the final Top League table for the last two Top League places in the Championship. This was competed by (Kobelco Steelers, NEC Green Rockets, Ricoh Black Rams, Fukuoka Sanix Blues, Kintetsu Liners, Coca-Cola West Red Sparks) and eventually taken by Kobelco Steelers and NEC Green Rockets.

Top Challenge One 
In the Top Challenge One series, Canon Eagles, NTT DoCoMo Red Hurricanes, Kyushu Denryoku Voltex from Top Challenge One and Honda Heat (Top Challenge Two Winner) competed over 3 rounds to gain the Top Challenge One place. This was eventually won by NTT DoCoMo Red Hurricanes.

University 
In the 47th Japan National University Rugby Championship final Teikyo University defeated Waseda University 17-12. Both teams gain entry to the Championship as finalists.

Club 
In the 18th All Japan Rugby Club Championship, Tamariba beat Hokkaido Barbarians 24-22 to gain the Top Club side entry to this Championship.

Qualifying Teams 

 Top League Playoff Finalists - Sanyo Wild Knights, Suntory Sungoliath
 Top League Wild Card Playoff - Toshiba Brave Lupus, Toyota Verblitz, NEC Green Rockets, Kobelco Steelers
 All Japan University Rugby Championship - Teikyo University, Waseda University
 All Japan Rugby Club Championship - Tamariba Club
 Top Challenger One Series - NTT DoCoMo Red Hurricanes

Knockout stages

First round

Quarter-final

Semi-final 

Suntory Sungoliath and Sanyo Wild Knights bypass the first two rounds into the semi-finals by reaching the final of the Top League Playoffs this year.

Final

See also 

 Rugby Union in Japan

External links 
 JRFU Pre-Tournament Review
 Official JRFU Scores and Details
 Official JRFU Final Details

All-Japan Rugby Football Championship
2010–11 in Japanese rugby union
Japan All